Senator Smallwood may refer to:

Jim Smallwood (born 1971), Colorado State Senate
William Smallwood (1732–1792), Maryland State Senate